Speed limits in Portugal depend on both the type of road and vehicle:

When using a trailer the limits are as follows:

See also
 List of highways in Portugal

References

Road transport in Portugal
Portugal